On the Way to the Peak of Normal is the third album by Holger Czukay, released in 1981 through Electrola.

Track listing

Personnel 
Holger Czukay – vocals, guitar, organ, vocoder, bass guitar, French horn, flute, harmonica, congas, production, engineering, mixing, recording, drums on "Two Bass Shuffle"
Eveline Grunwald – design
Uwe Jahnke – guitar on "On the Way to the Peak of Normal"
Jaki Liebezeit – drums
Conny Plank – synthesizer violin
Stephan Plank – illustrations, design
Uli Putsch – bass guitar on "On the Way to the Peak of Normal"
Harry Rag – vocals on "On the Way to the Peak of Normal"
Jah Wobble – bass guitar on "Hiss 'n' Listen"
Jürgen Wolter – organ on "On the Way to the Peak of Normal"

References 

1981 albums
Holger Czukay albums
Albums produced by Holger Czukay
EMI Records albums